Leonard Wallace Richardson (10 February 1891 – 7 April 1924) was an Australian rules footballer who played with Fitzroy in the Victorian Football League (VFL).

Notes

External links 

1891 births
1924 deaths
Australian rules footballers from Victoria (Australia)
Fitzroy Football Club players
Northcote Football Club players